The Minnesotan was an overnight passenger train run by the Chicago Great Western Railway, using the CGW's trackage between Grand Central Station in Chicago, Illinois, and Saint Paul Union Depot in Saint Paul, Minnesota, via Hayfield, Minnesota.  A section of the train split in McIntire, Iowa, to serve Rochester, Minnesota.

Begun as the Legionnaire in 1925, the train was renamed the Minnesotan in 1930, and was powered by a 4-6-2 Pacific-type locomotive.   The Minnesotan was one of the finest passenger trains the Great Western operated but could not compete against the more famous passenger trains of the Milwaukee Road and the Chicago and North Western.

The Great Western dropped the name on May 10, 1949, but Chicago to St. Paul passenger service continued to linger on for seven more years.  By the early 1950s, a doodlebug or (later) a single EMD F-unit pulled a railway post office car, a baggage car, and a coach.  This service was spartan compared to the Minnesotan of less than a decade earlier, and ceased entirely on August 11, 1956.

References

Chicago Great Western Railway
Named passenger trains of the United States
Railway services introduced in 1930
Railway services discontinued in 1956